Samarahan Division is one of the twelve administrative divisions in Sarawak, Malaysia. Formerly part of the First Division, which included Kuching, it became a separate Division on 24 July 1986, with a total area of 4,967.4 square kilometres.

Samarahan Division formerly contained five administrative districts: Samarahan, Asajaya, Serian,Gedong, Sebuyau and Simunjan. The total population was 246,782 (year 2010 census). but on 11 April 2015 the Serian District was separated to form a new Division. The population is ethnically mixed, with mostly Bidayuh, Iban, Malay and Chinese predominating.

On 11 November 2016, the status of Majlis Daerah Samarahan has been upgraded to Majlis Perbandaran Kota Samarahan, giving Kota Samarahan, the capital of Samarahan division from small town to town. The declaration took place in Kota Samarahan by the then Chief Minister of Sarawak, Tan Sri Datuk Patinggi (Dr.) Haji Adenan bin Haji Satem. He was represented by his deputy, Deputy Chief Minister, Tan Sri Datuk Amar James Jemut Masing.

Administration

Members of Parliament

References

External links

 e-Samarahan : Kota Samarahan News Portal